Valenstein Is a surname. Notable people with the surname include:

Elliot Valenstein (1923–2023), American professor emeritus of psychology and neuroscience
Lawrence Valenstein (1899–1982), American advertising executive